Birthing people may refer to:

People 
 Childbirth § Associated occupations, a collective term for all physicians, midwives, doctors, nurses, doulas, or others assisting with birth; used most commonly from the 1980s through 2000s
 Mothers, exclusively to birth mothers and not adoptive mothers, in speech and writings most commonly in the 2010s into the 2020s

Religion 
 "Born again" denominations use the phrase "birthing people" to refer to the work of the Holy Spirit or a particular ministry as new people are evangelized and born again.
 Creation myths may involve spiritual entities such as a mother goddess birthing people into the world.

See also 
 Breeder (slang)
 Menstruation § Terminology; section discusses gender-neutral language similar to one sense of "birthing people"
 Mother (disambiguation)
 Obstetric medicine